Morori (Marori, Moaraeri, Moraori, Morari) is a moribund Papuan language of the Kolopom branch of the Trans–New Guinea family. It is separated from the other Kolopom languages by the intrusive Marind family.  All speakers use Papuan Malay or Indonesian as L2, and many know Marind.

A dialect extinct in 1997, Menge, is remembered from ceremonial use.

Marori is spoken in Kampung Wasur, which in 2010 had 413 people (98 families) total and 119 Marori people (52 Marori families).

Phonology
Marori has 22 consonants and 6 vowels, which are:

Vowels i, e, æ, a, o, u

On the other hand, the majority of Trans-New Guinea languages usually have around 10–15 consonants.

Pronouns
Pronouns, but little else, connect it to TNG:

{|
! !!sg!!pl
|-
!1
|||
|-
!2
|||
|-
!3
|||
|}

Vocabulary
The following basic vocabulary words are from Voorhoeve (1975), as cited in the Trans-New Guinea database:

{| class="wikitable sortable"
! gloss !! Morori
|-
! head
| 
|-
! hair
| 
|-
! eye
| 
|-
! tooth
| 
|-
! leg
| 
|-
! louse
| 
|-
! dog
| 
|-
! pig
| 
|-
! bird
| 
|-
! egg
| 
|-
! blood
| 
|-
! bone
| 
|-
! skin
| 
|-
! tree
| 
|-
! man
| 
|-
! sun
| 
|-
! water
| 
|-
! fire
| 
|-
! stone
| 
|-
! name
| 
|-
! eat
| 
|-
! one
| 
|-
! two
| 
|}

Evolution
Marori reflexes of proto-Trans-New Guinea (pTNG) etyma are:

mam ‘breast’ < *amu
mam ‘mother’ < *am(a,i)
nemeŋk ‘louse’ < *niman
sa ‘sand’ < *sa(ŋg,k)asiŋ
ŋwar ‘bone’ < *kondaC

Further reading
Gebze, Wilhelmus and Mark Donohue. 1998. Kamus Kecil Bahasa Moraori. [Marori picture dictionary]: Distributed in Wasur, Papua.

References

Arka, I Wayan. 2012. Projecting morphology and agreement in Marori, an isolate of southern New Guinea. In Nicholas Evans and Marian Klamer (eds.), Melanesian Languages on the Edge of Asia: Challenges for the 21st Century, 150-173. Honolulu: University of Hawaii Press.

External links 
 ELAR Collection: The Endangered Papuan Languages of Merauke-Indonesia: ethnobiological and linguistic documentation deposited by I Wayan Arka

Kolopom languages
Languages of western New Guinea
Language isolates of New Guinea